Lucy Evans (born 26 May 1985) is an English actress best known for playing the role of Lauren Wilson in Coronation Street from 2007–2008.

Other roles include that of Debs in Mile High. She is a high-profile supporter of the League Against Cruel Sports.

Filmography

Film

Television

References

External links

1985 births
Living people
English soap opera actresses
English child actresses
Place of birth missing (living people)
English film actresses